Enoch Cree Nation 135A is a small, uninhabited Indian reserve of the Enoch Cree Nation in Alberta, located within Lac Ste. Anne County. It is 43 kilometres south of Barrhead.

References

Indian reserves in Alberta